A Rose is an early 20th-century painting by American artist Thomas Anshutz. Done in oil on canvas, the work depicts a young woman, Rebecca H. Whelen, sitting in a chair wearing a rose-colored dress. The painting - in keeping with artistic themes of the early 20th-century - compares a woman and her attire to a rose flower, but also evokes the sense that the young woman is intellectually and emotionally alert. Whelen herself was the daughter of a trustee of the Pennsylvania Academy of the Fine Arts at which Anshutz was a long-time teacher.

Anshutz's work has been compared to that of his contemporary Thomas Eakins (specifically Eakins'  1900 portrait The Thinker) and to Diego Velázquez.

A Rose is in the collection of the Metropolitan Museum of Art.

References 

1907 paintings
Paintings in the collection of the Metropolitan Museum of Art
Women in art